Eufranio "Franny" Chan Eriguel, M.D. (June 12, 1959 – May 12, 2018) was a Filipino medical doctor and politician from the Eriguel political clan of La Union,  who was assassinated in an ambush on May 12, 2018.

Eriguel served three terms as Mayor of Agoo, La Union and two terms as Congressman for the Second District of La Union. He is involved in the "Land Bank of the Philippines v. Cacayuran" case, in which there was to be a construction of a commercial building within the premises of the town plaza. The Philippine Supreme court later ruled it to be "irregular," although the court later granted a motion for reconsideration regarding the case on May 15, 2015, because the Municipality of Agoo had not been impleaded in the original case.

He later received wide media attention in 2016 when he was included by Philippine President Rodrigo Duterte as one of the local government officials and legislators allegedly involved in illegal drug trade in his August 16 "I am sorry for my country" speech—an allegation which he and other La Union politicians denied.

In April 2017, Eriguel's name was removed from the drug list, and the original inclusion was said to be politically motivated because rival politicians allegedly provided the list to President Duterte.

Eriguel, who had been a founding force in former Vice President Jejomar Binay's United Nationalist Alliance, was sworn into the ruling PDP–Laban party by Speaker Pantaleon Alvarez.

On May 12, 2018, Eriguel and two others were assassinated in an ambush. He had earlier survived a bombing incident in 2016 during the campaign period for the 2016 General Election.

His widow, Sandra Young Eriguel, currently serves as Congressman for the Second District of La Union, while his daughter, Stefanie Ann Eriguel, currently serves as Mayor of Agoo.

Early life 
Eufranio “Franny” C. Eriguel, M.D. was born to Dr. Eufemio Eriguel and Bibiana Chan on June 12, 1959. He was born in San Fernando, La Union and was the eldest of 9 siblings.

His early education consisted of graduating Salutatorian at Agoo East Central School. He continued on to attend Southern La Union National High School (DMMMSU) for his secondary education and graduated 1st Honorable Mention. He managed to top the National College Entrance Exam (NCEE), now known as the National Career Assessment Examination (NCAE) with a score of 99%. With his great academic achievements, Eriguel went on to study at the University of Santo Tomas where he pursued a pre-medical school degree, BS General Medicine. He completed his medical school degree in 1983 in the same university.

Eriguel worked as a doctor in the Philippines, serving as a Military Doctor for Camp Dangwa Region 1 Benguet, and eventually, as a Company Doctor at the Philippine Tourism Authority. He ended up leaving the Philippines to find more work opportunities in the United States.

Eriguel came back to the Philippines in 1995 after the death of his father, who was the Vice Mayor of the municipality of Agoo, La Union at the time.

Mayor of Agoo 
Following in his father's footsteps, Eriguel ran for Mayor and won, becoming the Mayor of Agoo on July 1, 1998. He held this office until June 30, 2007. Through his leadership, Agoo underwent various redevelopments and started various programs and events. These enabled Agoo to reap regional and national awards such as the Hall of Fame Awardee as the Cleanest, Safest and Greenest Municipality - 1st to 3rd Class Municipality Category (Gawad Pangulo sa Kapaligiran) Regional and National Level.

During his term, in the years 2002-04 and 2008, Agoo ranked 1st in the Department of Education's National Literacy Award as Most Outstanding LGU. In 2009, Agoo won Best LGU (1st - 3rd Class Municipality Category) in Literacy Promotion (2-time National and Regional Champion). Although this was awarded during Sandra Eriguel's, Eriguel's wife, term as Mayor, the literacy program was spearheaded by Eriguel in 1998.

Agoo, under Eriguel's term as Mayor, gained recognition by winning numerous local awards in different fields of local governance.

President of League of Mayors 
Eriguel served as the president for the Mayor's League of Municipalities of the Philippines from 1998 to 2007. The league is a "juridical body" that is mandated by the government. Its purpose is for the ventilation, articulation and crystallization of issues affecting municipal government administration, which are secured through proper and legal means.

Town Plaza commercialization and other events 
During his term as Mayor of Agoo, Eriguel was involved in the construction of a commercial building within the premises of the town plaza —a redevelopment which the Philippine Supreme court later ruled to be "irregular" in the "Land Bank of the Philippines v. Cacayuran" ruling. The decision "penalizes abusive municipal officials" even beyond their terms, so it is considered a “landmark” case in Philippine Jurisprudence. However, the court later granted a motion for reconsideration regarding the case on May 15, 2015, because the Municipality of Agoo had not been impleaded in the original case.

Another redevelopment which took place during Eriguel's term as Mayor of Agoo was the partial conversion of the Museo de Iloko into a franchise of fastfood giant Chowking.  The Don Eufemio F. Eriguel Memorial National High School, named after Eriguel's father, was also established during his term.

After a nine-year tenure, he had reached the maximum term limit June 30, 2007 and could no longer run for the position mayor of Agoo.  His wife Sandra Young Eriguel won as Mayor on May 15, 2007. Eriguel was then appointed as an adviser to the government of the province of La Union for municipal affairs—a post he held until June 30, 2010.

Congressman for the Second District of La Union 
In the elections of May 10, 2010, Eriguel was elected as a member of the House of Representatives as a candidate for the Nationalist People's Coalition (NPC), representing the 2nd District of La Union.  During his term as Congressman for the Second District of La Union, Eriguel served as chair of the House Committee on Health and was among the members of the bicameral committee that passed the Graphic Health Warning bill. As chair, Eriguel co-authored and pushed for the passing of various bills related to the health and wellness of Filipinos. This includes, but is not limited to, mandatory healthcare, mandatory immunization of hepatitis-B for infants, and the declaration of National Thyroid Cancer Awareness Week.

Agoo-Aringay cityhood proposal and other events 
On June 11, 2014, Eriguel filed House Bill 4644 in an attempt to create a new city in the Second District of La Union by merging the municipalities of Agoo and Aringay. The bill was co-authored by Eriguel's allies, La Union first district Rep. Victor Ortega and Abono party-list Rep. Francisco Emmanuelle Ortega III. The bill would have created the "City of Agoo-Aringay," having two districts under a city mayor and city vice mayor along with 14 councilors in the Sangguniang Panlungsod, all of which were "new" positions for which the former municipal officials could run despite having finished the terms limits of their offices. The purpose of the bill was to increase the Internal Revenue Allotment (IRA) received by the cities, so they could build more infrastructure, gain various employment and businesses, increase recreational activities, and among other benefits.

During his time as a congressman, Eriguel started festivals and events to solidify Agoo's rich culture and help its economy and tourism. The Dinengdeng festival, which was first celebrated in 2005, has been celebrate continuously to this day. The Kilawen festival, which was an idea he shared with his wife, Sandra Eriguel, was first celebrated on December 28, 2011.

Saranay Award 
In 2013, Eriguel was awarded the Saranay Award for his outstanding service during his time as a mayor and congressman. The Saranay Award is given to those with the “highest degree of excellence in their chosen fields.”

Bombing 
Eriguel's caravan was involved in a bombing incident, believed to be an assassination attempt, on April 30, 2016, in Agoo, La Union. The incident claimed the life of his driver-supporter, Mr. Jiovannie “Dalmas” Cacayuran and seriously injured eight (8) other individuals including his Aide, Mr. Samuel Ofiaza who lost his right eye. Mr. Cacayuran was only 31 years old, and he is survived by his wife and an eight-year-old son.

Temporary inclusion in President Duterte's narco-politicians list 
On August 16, 2016, Eriguel was included by Philippine President Rodrigo Duterte as one of the local government officials and legislators allegedly involved in illegal drug trade in his "I am sorry for my country" speech. Eriguel and other La Union politicians denied these allegations. In the last part of March 2017, Eriguel and three other La Union politicians were removed from the narco-politician list. A Manila Times news report quoted sources saying that the inclusion of Eriguel in the narco-politician list was politically motivated. The reporter said there were several personalities close to those in charge of providing the list to the President who have taken advantage of the situation to include the names of their rival politicians.

On June 17, 2018, Eriguel, who had been a founding force in former Vice President Jejomar Binay's United Nationalist Alliance, was sworn into the ruling PDP–Laban party by Speaker Pantaleon Alvarez.

Death 
On May 12, 2018, Eriguel and two others were gunned down by unknown assailants in an ambush during an event for the 2018 Barangay elections.

In 2019, May 12 was declared “Eriguel Day” by the Sangguniang Panlalawigan (Provincial Board) of La Union. This serves to commemorate Eriguel, his life and work for Agoo, as well as his sacrifice as it is celebrated on the anniversary of his death.

According to Eriguel's family, the ones responsible for his assassination are still at large.

See also 
 President Rodrigo Duterte's Narco politicians Speech
 List of political families in the Philippines
 Agoo
 La Union

References

1959 births
2018 deaths
Members of the House of Representatives of the Philippines from La Union
Mayors of places in La Union
20th-century Filipino medical doctors
21st-century Filipino medical doctors
People of the Philippine Drug War